Senior Project is a 2014 film directed by Nadine Truong and written by Jeremy Lin.

Premise 
A new kid at school hiding a secret must work with his classmates on a senior project.

Cast
 Ryan Potter as Peter Hammer
 Vanessa Marano as Samantha "Sam" Willow
 Kyle Massey as Andy
 Meaghan Martin as Natalia Bell
 Sterling Beaumon as Spencer Grace
 Lana McKissack as Jill
 Margaret Cho as Ms. Ghetty
 Katalina Viteri as Tiffany
 Lynn Telzer as Jennifer

Development
A successful KickStarter campaign for the film was launched by 16-year-old writer Jeremy Lin. Donating $1 gave backers a 'Spiritual Connection' and $5000 allowed them to appear as extras.

Lin was given the chance to pitch his script to screenwriter and investor Fabienne Wen at a film workshop. Brion Hambel and Paul Jenson then came on board as producers.

The first clip from the film was released on 8 April 2014. A video from the last day of the set was released on 27 October 2013.

The trailer was released on 27 May 2014.

Release
The film has been released on iTunes and Amazon Video.

References

2014 films
2014 comedy films
2010s English-language films